Thierry Bardini (born 1960s) is a French sociologist, author of the book Bootstrapping, about Douglas Engelbart. He is a full professor in the Department of Communication at the Université de Montréal, Canada. He is known for his work on innovation and sociology of technology.

Education and career
Bardini holds a degree in agronomy (1986) and his first work was on agriculture production systems. He wrote his PhD thesis on technical systems in agriculture. He also did fieldwork on the history of agriculture in Venezuela and on a multi-disciplinary research project around the jack-bean
Canavalia ensiformis agriculture and similar topics in Venezuela, before working in the United States on innovation diffusion under the direction of Everett Rogers at the University of Southern California Annenberg School for Communication. He then left for Université de Montréal, where he co-directs the Workshop in Radical Empiricism (with Brian Massumi).

Books
In 2000, he published Bootstrapping: Douglas Engelbart, Coevolution, and the Origins of Personal Computing, a book about Douglas Engelbart's career and the rise and fall of the Augmentation Research Center at Stanford Research Institute.

He has published a book titled Junkware in the Posthumanities Series at Minnesota Press in 2011.

Selected publications

References

Canadian sociologists
French sociologists
University of Southern California staff
Living people
French male non-fiction writers
Year of birth missing (living people)